Paracles herbuloti is a moth of the subfamily Arctiinae first described by Hervé de Toulgoët in 1975. It is found in Ecuador.

References

Moths described in 1975
Paracles